Kim Seo-hyung (born October 28, 1973) is a South Korean actress. She is best known for her portrayal as the evil mistress Shin Ae-ri in the SBS revenge drama Temptation of Wife (2008) and as Coach Kim in the JTBC television series Sky Castle (2018), for which she received a Best Actress nomination at the 55th Baeksang Arts Awards.

In 2014, she earned the award for Best Lead Actress in a Foreign Language Film at the 3rd Madrid International Film Festival for her performance in the film Late Spring. She also gained international attention for her role in The Villainess, which had its world premiere at the 70th Cannes Film Festival in May 2017.

Kim participated in the 1992 Miss Gangwon Pageant and made her acting debut as a KBS talent in 1994.

Filmography

Film

Television series

Web series

Discography

Awards and nominations

References

External links

 
 
 
 

South Korean film actresses
South Korean television actresses
1973 births
Living people
People from Gangneung
20th-century South Korean actresses
21st-century South Korean actresses